The following is the complete discography of Zao, an American metalcore band. The band's discography consists of eleven studio albums, two compilation albums, one video album, four music videos, and seven extended plays.

Albums

Studio albums

Compilation albums

Extended plays

Video albums

Demo albums

Remix albums

Songs

B-sides

Compilation appearances

Music videos

References 

Heavy metal group discographies
Discographies of American artists